Kremenskaya is a rural locality (a stanitsa) and the administrative center of Kremenskoye Rural Settlement, Kletsky District, Volgograd Oblast, Russia. The population was 836 as of 2010. There are 19 streets.

Geography 
Kremenskaya is located 52 km northeast of Kletskaya (the district's administrative centre) by road. Vyezdinsky is the nearest rural locality.

References 

Rural localities in Kletsky District